The Centre and Montello Streets Historic District encompasses an area of well-preserved commercial buildings in Brockton, Massachusetts.  The district extends west along Centre Street from the junction of Centre and Montello Streets in downtown Brockton, and includes a few buildings on Montello south of that intersection. The district was selected for historic status because it was thought to preserve Brockton's past as the "Shoe City". In the early 20th century Brockton was the largest manufacturer of shoes in the United States of America.

Style 
The buildings are typically three to five-story brick or brownstone buildings, with commercial styling characteristic of the late 19th and early 20th centuries. The Lily, Brackett & Co. Shoe Factory at 124–126 Montello Street is believed to be the oldest brick shoe factory building in the city. The district has been home to many types of tenants including, but not limited too: messianic lodges, shoe factories, insurance agencies, rubber stamp companies, and more.

The district was listed on the National Register of Historic Places in 2015.

See also

National Register of Historic Places listings in Plymouth County, Massachusetts

References

Historic districts in Plymouth County, Massachusetts
Buildings and structures in Brockton, Massachusetts
National Register of Historic Places in Plymouth County, Massachusetts
Historic districts on the National Register of Historic Places in Massachusetts